Wood Norton is a village and civil parish in the English county of Norfolk.

The villages name means 'North farm/settlement'. 'Wood' to distinguish from Pudding Norton.

For the purposes of local government, the parish falls within the district of North Norfolk. For Westminster elections to the House of Commons, Wood Norton lies within the Broadland constituency.

People
The original Blue Stocking, Benjamin Stillingfleet was born here where his father Edward Stillingfleet was rector.

Notes

External links

.
Information from Genuki Norfolk on Wood Norton.
NorfolkCoast.co.uk on Wood Norton.

Villages in Norfolk
Civil parishes in Norfolk
North Norfolk